This article has been translated from the French Wikipedia equivalent.

The following is a list of the wilayat, or provinces, of the North African country of Algeria by population.

See also
List of Algerian Provinces by area

References
  Algérie, Liste des Divisions Administratives - populationdata.net

Provinces